Once Upon a Dream may refer to:

Film and television
 Once Upon a Dream (1949 film), a British romantic comedy
 How I Married My High School Crush, a 2007 film which had the working title Once Upon a Dream
 Once Upon a Dream (TV series), a short-lived Australian children's series

Music
 Once Upon a Dream (The Rascals album), 1968
 * "(Finale): Once Upon a Dream", a 1968 song from the Rascals album
 Once Upon a Dream (Enchantment album)
 "Once Upon a Dream" (Sleeping Beauty song), the theme song of Aurora and Prince Phillip from the 1959 Disney film Sleeping Beauty
 "Once Upon a Dream" (Billy Fury song), 1962
 "Once Upon a Dream", a song from the musical Jekyll & Hyde and its prior concept albums
 "Once Upon a Dream", a song from the video game Project Sekai

Other uses
 Disney's Once Upon a Dream Parade, at the daily parade at Disneyland Park, which premiered on March 31, 2007 for the resort-wide 15th Anniversary Celebration